Ben 10: Ultimate Challenge is a game show for children themed after the Ben 10 series, developed by Turner Broadcasting System Europe in association with Twenty Twenty for various regional Cartoon Network channels. The show is running in twenty-five countries, and in seventeen countries in different languages and hosts starting from November 2011. Contestants include children between 7 and 12 years old.

In 2013, an exclusive Asian version has been produced in Malaysia for Cartoon Network thanks to the company Astro Productions, and it was aired only in five Southeast local countries (Malaysia, Singapore, Thailand, Philippines, and Indonesia). This version is titled Ben 10: Ultimate Challenge Asia and is hosted by Nabil Mahir.

The series had a revival as Ben 10 Challenge following the Ben 10 (2016 TV series). Ben 10 Challenge premiered on Cartoon Network UK on 13 October 2017.

Ben 10: Ultimate Challenge in the world

References

External links
 Ben 10: Ultimate Challenge on Internet Movie Database

Ben 10
British children's game shows
2010s British game shows
2011 British television series debuts
2011 British television series endings
Cartoon Network original programming
2010s British children's television series
British television series based on American television series
British television spin-offs
Television series about children